Otto Albert Nes (9 April 1920 – 4 July 2014) was a Norwegian broadcasting personality. He was born in Solum, Norway. He served as program director at the Norwegian Broadcasting Corporation from 1963 to 1987. He was a central person in the development of television in Norway.

References

1920 births
2014 deaths
People from Porsgrunn
NRK people